A water castle is a castle whose site is largely defended by water. It can be entirely surrounded by water-filled moats (moated castle) or natural waterbodies such as island castles in a river or offshore. The term comes from European castle studies, mainly German Burgenkunde, but is sometimes used in English-language popular science books and websites, and is mentioned in other more academic works. When stately homes were built in such a location, or a Wasserburg was later rebuilt as a residential manor, the German term becomes Wasserschloss, lit. "water palace/manor".

Description
Forde-Johnston describes such a site as "a castle in which water plays a prominent part in the defences." Apart from hindering attackers, an abundant supply of water was also an advantage during a siege. Topographically, such structures are a type of low-lying castle. Such a castle usually had only one entrance, which was via a drawbridge and that could be raised for protection in the event of an attack. To some extent these water castles had a fortress-like character.

There is a further distinction between:
 castles that are protected by artificial water-filled moats or man-made ponds, i.e. moated castles
 castles whose primary means of protection is from natural water bodies such as river courses, or which stand on islands or peninsulas in a natural marshland, pond, lake or sea. Island castles and marsh castles are such examples.

Legacy
In many places in Central Europe castles that had formerly been fortified changed their role or were converted over the course of time so that they became largely representational and residential buildings. The characteristic moats thus lost their original security function, but were retained in some cases as an element of landscaping. Today, in monument conservation circles, they are often described as burdensome, cost-intensive "historic legacies" because of the water damage caused to their foundations. As a result, many moats around castles in Germany have been drained, or more rarely filled, especially since the 1960s.

In Germany, the Wasserburgroute or "Water Castle Route" has been established in the triangle formed by the cities of Aachen, Bonn and Cologne which links 120 castles and palaces.

Examples

Austria
 Franzensburg

Baltic

 Āraiši (Arrasch)
 Trakai Island Castle

Belgium

 Wijnendale Castle

Czech Republic
 Blatná Castle
 Červená Lhota Castle
 Švihov Castle

Denmark
 Egeskov Castle
 Spøttrup Castle

Finland
 Kajaani Castle
 Olavinlinna

France

Please notice that in French "", literally 'water castle', means water tower.
 Château d'Ainay-le-Vieil
 Château de la Mothe-Chandeniers
 Château de Pirou
 Château du Plessis-Bourré
 Château de Trécesson
 Château de Suscinio
 Château de Sully
 Château de Sully-sur-Loire

Germany

Baden-Württemberg
 Bad Rappenau Water Castle
 Inzlingen Castle

Bavaria
 Brennhausen
 Irmelshausen
 Kleinbardorf
 Mespelbrunn Castle

Berlin
 Köpenick Palace
 Spandau Citadel

Brandenburg
 Plattenburg in the Prignitz

Bremen
 Blomendal Castle
 Schönebeck Palace

Hamburg
 Bergedorf Palace

Hesse
 Friedewald Water Castle in Friedewald
 Fürstenau Palace near Steinbach

Lower Saxony
 Fallersleben Castle
 Hülsede Water Castle
 Lütetsburg
 Osterburg
 Schelenburg
 Wendhausen Castle
 Wolfsburg Castle

Mecklenburg-Vorpommern
 Schwerin Castle

North Rhine-Westphalia
 Benrath House in Düsseldorf
 Burgau Castle
 Darfeld Castle
 Gimborn Castle
 Haus Kemnade in Bochum
 Morsbroich Castle in Leverkusen
 Moyland Castle in Bedburg-Hau
 Nordkirchen Palace
 Rheydt Palace
 Dyck Palace
 Vischering Castle
 Wilkinghege Water Castle in Münster
 Wittringen Castle in Gladbeck

Rhineland-Palatinate
 Alte Burg (Boppard)
 Alte Burg (Koblenz)

Saarland
 Gustavsburg in Homburg
 Kerpen Castle near Illingen

Saxony
 Moritzburg Castle
 Hainewalde Water Castle

Saxony-Anhalt
 Calvörde Castle
 Köthen Castle
 Reinharz Water Castle
 Flechtingen water castle

Schleswig-Holstein
 Eutin Castle
 Glücksburg Castle

Thuringia
 Kapellendorf Water Castle

Greece
 Bourtzi
 Methoni Castle

Hungary
 Sárvár Castle
 Tokaj Castle (ruined)

Indonesia 

 Taman Sari Water Castle

Italy
 Castello Estense
 Castello di Sirmione
 in a broad way, Venice Arsenal

Japan

 Imabari Castle
 Nakatsu Castle
 Takamatsu Castle

Lebanon
 Sidon Sea Castle

Netherlands

 Cannenburgh Castle
 Hoensbroek Castle
 Muiderslot
 Loevestein
 Ammersoyen Castle
 Kasteel Radboud
 Brederode Castle

Portugal
 Belém Tower

Slovakia
 Parič Castle (ruined)
 Šintava Castle (ruined)
 Štítnik Water Castle
 Vranov Castle (vanished)

Slovenia

 Otočec Castle

Sweden

 Älvsborg Fortress
 Bollerup
 Dybäck Castle
 Ellinge Castle
 Gåsevadholm Castle
 Gripsholm Castle
 Häckeberga Castle
 Hjularyd Castle
 Kalmar Castle
 Krageholm Castle
 Krapperup Castle
 Kronoberg Castle
 Kulla Gunnarstorp Castle
 Landskrona Citadel
 Malmö Castle
 Maltesholm Castle
 Örebro Castle
 Örup Castle
 Osbyholm Castle
 Skabersjö Castle
 Stegeborg Castle
 Strömsholm Palace
 Tosterup Castle
 Trolle-Ljungby Castle
 Trolleholm Castle
 Vadstena Castle
 Vaxholm Fortress
 Vegeholm Castle
 Vibyholm Castle
 Viderup Castle
 Vittskövle Castle

Romania
 Făgăraş Castle
 Oradea fortress

Switzerland
 Bottmingen Castle
 Chillon Castle
 Hagenwil Castle
 Hallwyl Castle
 Wörth Castle
 Wyher Castle

Turkey
 Kızkalesi (castle), formerly Gramvoussa (Greek) and Gorygos (Armenian)

United Kingdom

England
 Bodiam Castle
 Caister Castle
 Herstmonceux Castle
 Kenilworth Castle (moat drained)
 Leeds Castle

Scotland
 Caerlaverock Castle
 Castle Stalker
 Eilean Donan

Wales
 Caerphilly Castle
 Beaumaris Castle

Notes

References

Citations

General
 Suffolk Institute of Archaeology and History (2005). Proceedings of the Suffolk Institute of Archaeology and History, Vol. 41, Part 1. Suffolk Institute of Archaeology and History.
 Fry, Plantagenet Somerset (1996). Castles of Britain and Ireland: The Ultimate Reference Book. David & Charles.
 Gothein, Marie Luise Schroeter and Walter P. Wright (2014). A History of Garden Art. Cambridge: CUP.
 Kaufmann, J. E. and H.W. Kaufmann (2004) The Medieval Fortress: Castles, Forts and Walled Cities of the Middle Ages. Cambridge, MA: Da Capo.

External links 

Castles by type